Lacona may refer to:

Italy
Lacona, Capoliveri

United States
Lacona, Iowa
Lacona, New York

See also
Laconia (disambiguation)